David Dermer (born 1963) was a Miami Beach City Commissioner before being elected as their Mayor.  He is a lifelong Democrat, but supported George W. Bush for president in 2004. His brother is Ron Dermer, the former Israeli ambassador to the United States. His father Jay Dermer also served as mayor of Miami Beach.

Career
Dermer served as Mayor for three terms from 2002 until 2008.  He also serves on the advisory board of the Sacred Grounds Foundation.

In 2005, Dermer passed a law that banned sex offenders from living within 2,500 feet of schools, parks and other places frequented by minors.  Fearing an influx of sex offenders from Miami Beach, other Miami Dade County cities soon passed similar ordinances, eventually leading to the creation of the Julia Tuttle Causeway sex offender colony. Ironically, Dermer's ordinance, which had been intended to exclude sex offenders from Miami Beach, instead resulted in sex offenders from all across the county being dumped on the entrance to Miami Beach.

References

1963 births
Living people
Jewish mayors of places in the United States
Lawyers from Miami
Mayors of Miami Beach, Florida
American prosecutors
Florida Republicans
Miami Beach Senior High School alumni
American University alumni
Cumberland School of Law alumni
21st-century American Jews